The Public Service Alliance of Canada (PSAC; , AFPC) is one of Canada's largest national labour unions and the largest union in the Canadian federal public sector. PSAC members work in every province and territory, and also work abroad in embassies and consulates.

Many of PSAC's some 200,000 members work for the federal public service, crown corporations, or agencies as immigration officers, fisheries officers, food inspectors, customs officers, national defence civilian employees, and the like. However, an increasing number of PSAC members work in non-federal sectors: in women's shelters, universities, security agencies and casinos. In Northern Canada, PSAC represents most unionized workers employed in the Yukon, Nunavut and the Northwest Territories.

PSAC's National President is Chris Aylward.

PSAC is headquartered in Ottawa with 23 regional offices across Canada. PSAC's Ottawa headquarters building, designed in 1968 by Paul Schoeler, is a notable example of modernist architecture in Ottawa.

History

PSAC was formed when the Civil Service Association of Canada, led by Calbert Best, and Civil Service Federation of Canada, led by Claude Edwards, agreed to merge. Claude Edwards was elected as the first PSAC president. PSAC's founding convention took place at Ottawa's Chateau Laurier in 1966.

Bargaining 

PSAC signed its first collective agreements with Treasury Board in 1968. By 2015, the union was negotiating 316 separate collective agreements under federal, provincial and territorial jurisdictions.

Strikes 

PSAC's first strike came in November 1971 against Defence Construction Ltd. In 1980, the PSAC's large CR bargaining unit, made up largely of women clerical workers, went out on in Canada's biggest single bargaining unit work stoppage. PSAC's 1991 general strike, the largest single union strike in Canadian history, brought job security improvements.

Women in the union 

Most founding convention delegates were men. In 1967, PSAC began organizing secretaries, stenographers and typists. By 1976, PSAC had abolished the practice of tying a secretary’s salary to the rank of her boss (a practice known as "rug-ranking"), created an Equal Opportunities Committee to address women's issues and elected Aileen Manion, PSAC's first female national officer.

Equality rights 

From 1981 onward, PSAC's Equal Opportunities Committee included all equity-seeking groups. In 1988, PSAC adopted a comprehensive human rights policy. Action committees for members with disabilities and racially visible members started in 1990. By 1999, the union started holding conferences for racially visible members, Aboriginal Peoples and workers with disabilities. In 2004, the first network of Aboriginal, Inuit and Metis members was formed to advance their rights within and beyond the union.

Executive 

The National President, the National Executive Vice-President and the seven Regional Executive Vice-Presidents form the Alliance Executive Committee (AEC). The AEC is responsible for the day-to-day decisions of the union with respect to finances, overseeing campaigns, mobilizing the membership, advocating on behalf of the membership and advancing the union and its members' rights in the workplace. The AEC meets monthly and as needed.

The current REVPs are:

 Colleen Coffey, Regional Executive Vice-President, Atlantic
 Yvon Barrière, Regional Executive Vice-President, Québec
 Alex Silas, Regional Executive Vice-President, National Capital Region
 Sharon DeSousa, Regional Executive Vice-President, Ontario
 Marianne Hladun, Regional Executive Vice-President, Prairies
 Jamey Mills, Regional Executive Vice-President, British Columbia
 Jack Bourassa, Regional Executive Vice-President, North

Components
 Agriculture Union (AU/PSAC) formerly the Canada Agriculture National Employees Association (CANEA) charter union
 Canada Employment and Immigration Union (CEIU/PSAC) charter union
 Customs and Immigration Union (CIU/PSAC) charter union
 Government Services Union (GSU/PSAC) joined after the merger in 1999 with the former Union of Public Works Employees and Supply and Services Union
 Nunavut Employees Union (NEU/PSAC) joined in 1999, previously members had belonged to the UNW
 Union of Canadian Transportation Employees (UCTE/PSAC) charter union – merged with the Natural Resources Union in 2017
 Union of Health and Environment Workers (UHEW/PSAC) formed by a merger of the Union of Environment Workers and the National Health Union in 2016
 Union of National Defence Employees (UNDE/PSAC) charter union
 Union of National Employees (NE/PSAC) (formerly the National Component) charter union
 Union of Northern Workers (UNW/PSAC) joined in 1970
 Union of Postal Communications Employees (UPCE/PSAC) joined in 1967, successor to the former Canadian Railway Mail Clerks Federation
 Union of Solicitor General Employees (USGE/PSAC)
 Union of Taxation Employees (UTE/PSAC) charter union
 Union of Veterans Employees (UVE/PSAC) charter union
 Yukon Employees Union (YEU/PSAC) joined in 1990

Presidents
 Chris Aylward (UTE) 2018–present
 Robyn Benson (UTE), 2012–2018
 John Gordon (GSU), 2006–2012
 Nycole Turmel (CEIU), 2000–2006
 Daryl Bean (PWU/GSU), 1985–2000
 Pierre Samson (CEIU), 1982–1985
 Andy Stewart (AU), 1976–1982
 Claude Edwards, Civil Service Federation of Canada (CSFC), 1966–1976

References

External links

 

Canadian Labour Congress
Public Services International
UNI Global Union
Organizations based in Ottawa
Trade unions in Canada
Trade unions established in 1966